Birmaharajpur is a Vidhan Sabha constituency of Subarnapur district, Odisha.

This constituency includes Binika NAC, Birmaharajpur block, Ullunda block and 13 GPs (Babupalli, Bankigirdi, Bausuni, Bhandar, Charda, Kaintara, Mahadevpalli, Meghala, Seledi, Shankara, Silati, Sindurpur and Singhijuba) of Binika block.

Elected Members

Eleven elections were held between 1951 and 2014 including a by-election in 2003.
Elected members from the Birmaharajpur constituency are:
2019: (64): Padmanabha Behera (BJD)
2014: (64): Padmanabha Behera (BJD)
2009: (64): Padmanabh Behera (BJD)
2004: (114): Sanjeeb Kumar Sahoo (BJD)
2003: (By-Poll): Sanjeeb Kumar Sahoo (BJD)
2000: (114): Baishnaba Padhan (BJD)
1995: (114): Ram Chandra Pradhan (Congress)
1990: (114): Rabirarayan Panigrahi (Janata Dal)
1985: (114): Kartika Prasad Taria (Congress)
1980: (114): Hrushikesh Hota (Congress-I)
1977: (114): Surendra Pradhan (Janata Party)
1974: (114): Hrushikesh Hota (Congress)
1951: (27): Achutananda Mahakur (Ganatantra Parishad)

2019 Election Result

2014 Election Result
In 2014 election, Biju Janata Dal candidate Padmanabh Behera defeated Bharatiya Janata Party candidate Ananda Barik  by a margin of 31,290 votes.

2009 Election Result
In 2009 election, Biju Janata Dal candidate Padmanabh Behera defeated Indian National Congress candidate Binod Patra  by a margin of 21,401 votes.

Notes

References

Assembly constituencies of Odisha
Subarnapur district